Knight Park–Howell Station, also known as Howell Station Historic District, is a National historic district and neighborhood in, Atlanta, Georgia.  Almost all buildings in the area were destroyed in the American Civil War, in Sherman's March to the Sea, and all of the buildings in the district were built after 1864. The neighborhood was listed on the National Register of Historic Places in 1997.

References

External links
Howell Station Historic District, a National Park Service travel itinerary webpage
Howell Station Neighborhood Association

Historic districts on the National Register of Historic Places in Georgia (U.S. state)
Neighborhoods in Atlanta
Bungalow architecture in Georgia (U.S. state)
National Register of Historic Places in Atlanta